Fabienne Kohlmann (born 6 November 1989 in Würzburg, Bavaria) is a German track and field athlete who specialises in the 400 metres hurdles and the 800 metres.

International competitions

References

External links 
 
 
 
 
 

1989 births
Living people
Sportspeople from Würzburg
German female hurdlers
Athletes (track and field) at the 2012 Summer Olympics
Athletes (track and field) at the 2016 Summer Olympics
Olympic athletes of Germany
European Athletics Championships medalists
World Athletics Championships athletes for Germany
Universiade medalists in athletics (track and field)
Universiade bronze medalists for Germany
Medalists at the 2015 Summer Universiade